is a passenger railway station  located in the city of Sanda, Hyōgo Prefecture, Japan. It is operated by the private transportation company, Kobe Electric Railway (Shintetsu).

Lines

Station layout
The station consists of one ground-level island platform serving two tracks, connected to the station building by an underground passage. The station is unattended.

Platforms

Adjacent stations

History
Sanda Honmachi Station opened on October 10, 1929 as a station on the Kobe Arima Electric Railway Sanda Line. On January 9, 1947 due to a company merger, it became a station on the  Kobe Electric Railway. The station building was reconstructed in 1991.

Passenger statistics
In fiscal 2019, the station was used by an average of 338 passengers daily

Surrounding area
Although it is located on the outskirts of Sanda City, it is close to Honmachi, the center of the old town
Japan National Route 276

See also
List of railway stations in Japan

References

External links 

  Official home page 

Railway stations in Hyōgo Prefecture
Railway stations in Japan opened in 1929
Sanda, Hyōgo